A Map of All Our Failures is the 11th studio album by English doom metal band My Dying Bride, released on 15 October 2012 via Peaceville Records. Limited editions of the album included a bonus track and a DVD featuring a 70-minute documentary, An Evening With the Bride. The album cover artwork was by Rhett Podersoo.

Musical style
Vocalist Aaron Stainthorpe described the album as being similar to the band's previous effort, For Lies I Sire, but said that the music had evolved. He described the lyrics as being about religion, passion, love and loss. Bassist Lena Abé described the album as being a "new style of writing, done in an old way", and almost having a "live sound" due to the presence of feedback and "raw and rough" elements. Guitarist Andrew Craighan described the album as "a controlled demolition of all your hopes".

Track listing

Personnel
 My Dying Bride
Aaron Stainthorpe – vocals
Andrew Craighan – guitars
Hamish Glencross – guitars
Lena Abé – bass
Shaun Macgowan – keyboards, violins

Additional musicians
Shaun Taylor Steels – drums

Charts

References

My Dying Bride albums
2012 albums